Luka Stojanovski (born February 4, 2000) is a Macedonian professional basketball Shooting guard who currently is playing for KK Euro Nickel of Macedonian First League.

Professional career
On October 2, 2018, he signed his first professional contract with KK MZT Skopje, He played his first professional season 2018-2019 in ABA League Second Division and Macedonian first league.

References
4. http://www.fiba.basketball/europe/u18b/2018/news/mkd-down-iceland-with-stojanovski-s-game-winner-isbetcherian-and-drell-impress-in-group-b

External links
 eurobasket.com
 realgm.com

2000 births
Living people
Macedonian men's basketball players
Sportspeople from Skopje
Point guards
KK Akademija FMP players
Shooting guards